Kurumba may refer to:

 Kuruba, also known as Kurumba, Kuruma, Kurumbar or Kuruba Gowda, a Hindu caste in India
 Alu Kurumba language, Dravidian language of India
 Betta Kurumba language, Dravidian language of India
 Jennu Kurumba language, Dravidian language of India
 Kurumba language, Dravidian language spoken in southern India
 Kurumba (tribe), Dravidian ethnic group in India
 Kurumba, Panchthar, village in eastern Nepal
 HMAS Kurumba, oil tanker operated by the Royal Australian Navy from 1919 to 1946
 Kurumba Maldives, a resort in the Maldives

Language and nationality disambiguation pages